Wednesbury Old Canal is part of the Birmingham Canal Navigations (BCN) in West Midlands (county), England. It opened in 1769, and although parts of it were abandoned in 1955 and 1960, the section between Pudding Green Junction and Ryder's Green Junction is navigable, as it provides a link to the Walsall Canal. A short stub beyond Ryder's Green Junction is connected to the network but difficult to navigate.

Route
Wednesbury Old Canal leaves the main line Birmingham level at Pudding Green Junction and passes through a completely industrial landscape. At Ryders Green Junction the Walsall Canal begins its descent down the eight Ryder's Green Locks. Just before the locks Wednesbury Old Canal veers off and commences its meandering route through Swan Village and, originally, around the collieries. The canal beyond Swan Bridge Junction was also known as the Balls Hill Branch.

This part of the canal is now only open to boat traffic as far as the Black Country Spine Road, following the decision to build a new bridge which didn't allow enough headroom for boats to pass. In practice, even this section is badly overgrown and unlikely to be navigable throughout. The Wednesbury Canal is dry from this point, but the Ridgacre Branch continues, watered for most of its original length (without its branches) past the culverted road and, although inaccessible to boats, is now used for fishing, walking and is a valued wildlife habitat.

Some modern sources mark the Ridgacre as starting at Ryder's Green Junction but this is not historically correct.

History
The Wednesbury Canal was part of the first phase of the Birmingham Canal (the first around the Black Country or Birmingham).

It was authorised in the 1768 Birmingham Canal Act which authorised the Birmingham Canal and branches to Wednesbury and Ocker Hill

as a major branch of the Birmingham Canal and was completed and delivering coal to Birmingham on 6 November 1769, even before the Birmingham Canal had reached Wolverhampton.

It started at what is now Spon Lane Junction (Wolverhampton Level) and descended the three remaining Spon Lane locks to the Birmingham Level. It terminated at Balls Hill Basin, not far from the later Tame Valley Canal.

It ran from the Wednesbury at Swan Bridge Junction, a short distance north of the New Swan Lane / Black Country New Road roundabout. From it ran the Dartmouth Branch northwards and the Halford Branch southwards to collieries.

The 'Island Line' – Thomas Telford's BCN New Main Line cut in a straight line from Tipton Factory Locks towards Spon Lane bottom lock (Bromford Junction, and then on to Smethwick and Birmingham). It cut into the original Wednesbury Canal, forming Pudding Lane Junction, and the short, curved length of the Wednesbury Canal between there and Bromford Junction was lost.

The Wednesbury Old Canal was given abandoned status by 1955 and 1960 Acts. Recent road developments (Black Country New Road) at Swan Bridge Junction have severed the connection to the remaining, navigable canal, and have also severed the Ridgacre Branch from the canal network.

Wednesbury Canal original features

See also

Canals of the United Kingdom
History of the British canal system

References

Historical Map of the Birmingham Canals, Richard Dean, M. & M. Baldwin, 1989, 
Ordnance Survey Six Inch Series (1:10,560), Map SO99SE, 1955

Canals in the West Midlands (county)
Birmingham Canal Navigations
Wednesbury
Canals opened in 1769